Live ?!*@ Like a Suicide is a four-track EP by American hard rock band Guns N' Roses, released on December 16, 1986, on the UZI Suicide record label. When referred to by band members, they have simply called the EP Live Like a Suicide. The record itself was reportedly limited to only 10,000 copies, released only in vinyl and cassette formats.

The tracks were later re-released along with four new songs as the album G N' R Lies (1988).

In 2018, they were included as bonus tracks on the reissue of Appetite for Destruction and featured seamless crowd noise between the songs along with a fifth song, "Shadow of Your Love".

Background
The four songs on the EP were selected from the band's demo tapes: two are cover versions and two are originals. The EP was a faux-live recording with overdubbed crowd noise, but these are in fact studio performances.

According to Steven Adler's autobiography, My Appetite for Destruction: Sex & Drugs & Guns N' Roses, the entire EP was recorded at Pasha Studios in Hollywood with pre-recorded audience applause and cheering in the background, as Geffen's engineers told him "it would cost too much to actually record a live record". Duff McKagan says in his autobiography, It's So Easy (and other Lies),  that "the crowd noise...is from a 1970's rock festival called the Texxas Jam. We thought it would be funny to put a huge stadium crowd in the background at a time when we were lucky to be playing to a few hundred."

"Reckless Life" is the opening track on the EP. It opens with Slash shouting "Hey fuckers! Suck on Guns N' fuckin' Roses!" This song was originally written by Hollywood Rose, which had included all the members of Guns N' Roses except Duff McKagan at one point or another. It was included in the Hollywood Rose compilation album The Roots of Guns N' Roses. 
"Nice Boys" is a cover of a song by Rose Tattoo. "Move to the City" features a horn section, and is the third track on the EP. "Mama Kin" is a cover of a song by Aerosmith, a band Guns N' Roses has cited as one of their major influences.

One song considered for this EP was "Shadow of Your Love", which never made it onto the album, and later released on the "It’s So Easy/Mr. Brownstone" 12" single and the EP Live from the Jungle.

Artwork
The front cover consists of a photograph of two of the band members, Duff McKagan and Axl Rose (from left to right), with an early Guns N' Roses logo, designed by Slash, overhead. The artwork from this EP is also featured in the G N' R Lies album artwork.

Promotion
To celebrate the release of the EP Guns N' Roses had a release party at Riki Rachtman's World Famous Cathouse. That was the first live performance at the club. It was acoustic and this was before MTV had the unplugged series, so an acoustic set from a heavy metal act was rather obscure in 1986. In 2010, Steven Adler claimed that Guns N' Roses got Rodney on the ROQ at KROQ-FM to initially play "Reckless Life" by giving Rodney one gram of cocaine.

Track listing

Personnel
Adapted from AllMusic.

W. Axl Rose – lead vocals, production
Slash – lead and rhythm guitars, backing vocals, production
Izzy Stradlin – rhythm and lead guitars, backing vocals, production
Duff "Rose" McKagan – bass, backing vocals, production
Steven Adler – drums, backing vocals, percussion, production

References

Guns N' Roses EPs
1986 debut EPs
Demo albums